is a former Japanese football player.

Playing career
Kajiyama was born in Hiroshima Prefecture on September 8, 1971. After graduating from high school, he joined the Japan Football League club Kawasaki Steel (later Vissel Kobe). The club won second place in 1996 and was promoted to the J1 League in 1997. However he did not play in many matches and retired at the end of the 1997 season.

Club statistics

References

External links

1971 births
Living people
Association football people from Hiroshima Prefecture
Japanese footballers
J1 League players
Japan Football League (1992–1998) players
Vissel Kobe players
Association football defenders